Belasco is a station on Pittsburgh Regional Transit's light rail network, located in the Beechview neighborhood of Pittsburgh, Pennsylvania. The street level stop is located on a small island platform in the middle of Broadway Avenue, through which The T travels along former streetcar tracks. The station serves a densely populated residential area through which bus service is limited because of the hilly terrain.

References

External links 

Port Authority T Stations Listings

Port Authority of Allegheny County stations
Railway stations in the United States opened in 1987
Red Line (Pittsburgh)